Jomo may refer to:

People
 Jomo (given name), an African masculine given name
 Jomo Sono (born 1955), South African soccer club owner, coach and former player Ephraim Matsilela Sono
 nickname of Moemedi Moatlhaping (born 1985), Botswanan footballer
 JoMo (born 1979), nickname of professional wrestler John Morrison
 JoMo (born 1961), stage name of French/Esperanto musician Jean-Marc Leclercq

Other uses
 Jomo (crater), a small lunar crater
 Jōmō Line, a railway line in Gunma Prefecture, operated by Jōmō Electric Railway Company
 Jomo Cosmos F.C., a South African football club
 Jōmō, a nickname for Gunma Prefecture
 JOMO, a brand used for Japan Energy filling stations